

mev-mez

Mevacor
mevastatin (INN)
mexafylline (INN)
Mexate
Mexx
mexazolam (INN)
mexenone (INN)
mexiletine (INN)
mexiprostil (INN)
Mexitil
mexoprofen (INN)
mexrenoate potassium (INN)
mezacopride (INN)
mezepine (INN)
mezilamine (INN)
Mezlin
mezlocillin (INN)

mi

mia-mic
Miacalcin
mianserin (INN)
mibampator (USAN)
mibefradil (INN)
mibolerone (INN)
miboplatin (INN)
Micardis
micinicate (INN)
miconazole (INN)
Micort-HC
Micrainin
Micro-K
Microderm
Microgestin Fe
Microlax
Microlite
Micron C
micronomicin (INN)
Micronor
Microsul
Microzide

mid-mik
midaflur (INN)
midaglizole (INN)
midamaline (INN)
Midamor
midazogrel (INN)
midazolam (INN)
midecamycin (INN)
mideplanin (INN)
midesteine (INN)
midodrine (INN)
Midol
midostaurin (USAN)
mifamurtide (USAN)
mifentidine (INN)
Mifeprex
mifepristone (INN)
mifobate (INN)
migafocon A (USAN)
migalastat hydrochloride (USAN)
Migergot
miglitol (INN)
Migranal
mikamycin (INN)

mil-mim
milacainide (INN)
milacemide (INN)
milameline (INN)
milatuzumab (USAN)
milenperone (INN)
mildronate 
milfasartan (INN)
milipertine (INN)
milnacipran (INN)
milodistim (INN)
Milontin
Milophene
miloxacin (INN)
Milprem
milrinone (INN)
miltefosine (INN)
Miltown
milverine (INN)
milveterol hydrochloride (USAN)
mimbane (INN)

min-mio
minalrestat (INN)
minamestane (INN)
minaprine (INN)
minaxolone (INN)
mindodilol (INN)
mindoperone (INN)
minepentate (INN)
Minipress
Minirin
Minitec
Minitran
Minizide
Minocin
minocromil (INN)
minocycline (INN)
minodronic acid (INN)
Minodyl
minolteparin sodium (INN)
minoxidil (INN)
minretumomab (INN)
Mintezol
Miochol
mioflazine (INN)
Miostat

mip-mis
mipimazole (INN)
mipitroban (INN)
mipomersen sodium (USAN)
mipragoside (INN)
miproxifene (INN)
mirabegron (USAN)
Miradon
Miralax
Miraluma
Mirapex
miravirsen (INN)
Mircette
Mirena
mirfentanil (INN)
mirimostim (INN)
mirincamycin (INN)
miripirium chloride (INN)
mirisetron (INN)
miristalkonium chloride (INN)
mirococept (INN)
miroprofen (INN)
mirosamicin (INN)
mirostipen (INN)
mirtazapine (INN)
misonidazole (INN)
misoprostol (INN)

mit
mitemcinal fumarate (USAN)
Mithracin (Pfizer)
mitiglinide (INN)
mitindomide (INN)
mitobronitol (INN)
mitocarcin (INN)
mitoclomine (INN)
mitoflaxone (INN)
mitogillin (INN)
mitoguazone (INN)
mitolactol (INN)
mitomalcin (INN)
mitomycin (INN)
mitonafide (INN)
mitopodozide (INN)
mitoquidone (INN)
mitoquinone (INN)
mitosper (INN)
mitotane (INN)
mitotenamine (INN)
mitoxantrone (INN)
mitozolomide (INN)
Mitozytrex (Supergen)
mitratapide (USAN)
mitumomab (INN)
mitumprotimut-T (USAN)

miv-miz
Mivacron
mivacurium chloride (INN)
mivazerol (INN)
mivobulin (INN)
mixidine (INN)
Mixtard
mizolastine (INN)
mizoribine (INN)